Ezequiel Enrique Carrasco Ayala (born September 11, 2002) is a Canadian soccer player who plays as a goalkeeper.

Early life
Carrasco played youth soccer with Kleinburg Nobleton SC and spent time training with Chilean club Everton de Viña del Mar.

Playing career
In March 2020, Carrasco went on trial with Canadian Premier League side York9 FC and participated their preseason training camp in Florida. In July 2020, he signed his first professional contract with the club ahead of the delayed 2020 season, at the age of seventeen. On August 29, 2020, he made his professional debut as a starter against HFX Wanderers FC after an injury to first-choice keeper Nathan Ingham. In November 2020, his option for the following season was declined by York.

In 2021, he began playing college soccer with Humber College. With Humber he was a 2021 CCAA National Champion and 2021 OCAA Provincial Champion.

Career statistics

References

External links
 

2002 births
Living people
Association football goalkeepers
Canadian Premier League players
Canadian soccer players
Soccer players from Toronto
York United FC players